The Girls at the Back is a Spanish comedy-drama television series created by Daniel Sánchez Arévalo. It stars Itsaso Arana, Mariona Terés, Mónica Miranda, María Rodríguez, and Godeliv Van den Brandt.

Plot 
The plot tracks five childhood friends (Alma, Olga, Leo, Carol, and Sara), now past their thirties, fulfilling a yearly tradition: making a trip together. But this time the trip is special, as one of the members of the group has been diagnosed with cancer.

Cast

Production 
The series was produced by José Antonio Félez (Atípica Films) for Netflix. Shooting locations included the coastline of the province of Cádiz (from Tarifa to Conil) and the Madrid region.

Release 
Netflix released the series on 23 September 2022.

Accolades 

|-
| rowspan = "3" align = "center" | 2023 || rowspan = "1" | 10th Feroz Awards || colspan = "2" | Best Comedy Series ||  || rowspan = "1" | 
|-
| 31st Actors and Actresses Union Awards || Best Television Actress in a Leading Role || Mariona Terés ||  || 
|-
| 34th GLAAD Media Awards || colspan = "2" | Outstanding Spanish-Language Scripted Television Series ||  || align = "center" | 
|}

References

External links 
 

Spanish comedy-drama television series
Spanish-language Netflix original programming
2022 Spanish television series debuts
Television shows filmed in Spain
2020s Spanish drama television series
2020s Spanish comedy television series